Robert 'Bob' Perry (March 17, 1933) is a retired American male tennis player who was active in the 1950s and 1960s.

Tennis career
Perry started playing tennis in 1944 at age eleven. He won the National 15 and under singles and doubles titles.

In 1956 Perry won the doubles title at the French Championships partnering Don Candy. They defeated Ashley Cooper and Lew Hoad in straight sets.

He won the inaugural singles title at the Auckland Championships in 1956, defeating Allan Burns in the final.

In 1972, after his active playing career had ended, Perry became a tennis coach at the La Jolla Tennis Club where he remained until 1999.

Grand Slam finals

Doubles: 1 (1 title)

References

External links
 
 

1933 births
American male tennis players
Grand Slam (tennis) champions in men's doubles
Tennis players from Los Angeles
Living people
French Championships (tennis) champions
UCLA Bruins men's tennis players